Hippolyte-Jacques Hyvernaud (27 October 1870 – 17 October 1914) was a French fencer. He competed in the individual épée events at the 1900 Summer Olympics.

References

External links
 

1870 births
1914 deaths
Sportspeople from Creuse
French male épée fencers
Olympic fencers of France
Fencers at the 1900 Summer Olympics
Place of death missing